Enrico Rivolta (29 June 1905 – 18 March 1974) was an Italian association footballer who played as a midfielder. He competed in the 1928 Summer Olympics with the Italy national football team. as well as played one match for the successful 1927-30 Central European International Cup squad.

International career
Rivolta was a member of the Italy national team which won the bronze medal in the 1928 Olympic football tournament and due to his single match also the team that won the gold medal in the 1927-30 Central European International Cup.

Honours

Club
Inter
 Serie A: 1929–30

International 
Italy
 Central European International Cup: 1927-30
 Summer Olympics: Bronze 1928

References

External links
 
 
 
 

1905 births
1974 deaths
Italian footballers
Footballers at the 1928 Summer Olympics
Olympic footballers of Italy
Olympic bronze medalists for Italy
Italy international footballers
Serie A players
Inter Milan players
S.S.C. Napoli players
Olympic medalists in football
Medalists at the 1928 Summer Olympics
Association football midfielders